Opogona is a genus of the fungus moth family, Tineidae. Therein, it belongs to the subfamily Hieroxestinae. As it includes Opogona omoscopa, the type species of the now-abolished genus Hieroxestis, it is the type genus of its subfamily.

They are most common in the tropical parts of the world; for example, from Australia, almost thirty species are known. Two members of this genus – the banana moth (O. sacchari) and to a lesser extent O. omoscopa – have been introduced to Europe.

Selected species
The numerous species of Opogona include:

 Opogona aemula  Meyrick, 1915  (India)
 Opogona amphicausta  Meyrick, 1907  (Sri Lanka)
 Opogona anaclina  Meyrick, 1915  (India)
 Opogona arizonensis Davis, 1978
 Opogona asema (Turner, 1900) (Australia)
 Opogona aurisquamosa Butler, 1881 (from Pacific, Society islands, Marquesas, Fiji, Kermadec Islands, Hawaii)
 Opogona autogama  (Meyrick, 1911) (Seychelles)
 Opogona basilissa (Turner, 1917) (Australia)
 Opogona bicolorella (Matsumura, 1931)
 Opogona calculata Meyrick, 1919 (Australia)
 Opogona caryospila Meyrick, 1920
 Opogona cataclasta Meyrick, 1915
 Opogona chalinota  Meyrick, 1910 (India)
 Opogona choleropis  Meyrick, 1920  (Andaman)
 Opogona chrysophanes Meyrick, 1915
 Opogona citrolopha Meyrick, 1932
 Opogona citriseca  Meyrick, 1928  (Andaman)
 Opogona cleonyma (Meyrick, 1897)
 Opogona clinomima  (Meyrick, 1918)  (India)
 Opogona comptella (Walker, 1864) (Australia/New Zealand)
 Opogona confinis Turner, 1926 (Australia)
 Opogona conjurata (Meyrick, 1920)
 Opogona crypsipyra Turner, 1923 (Australia)
 Opogona dimidiatella Zeller, 1853
 Opogona discordia J.F.G.Clarke, 1986
 Opogona doxophanes  Meyrick, 1915  (Sri Lanka)
 Opogona dramatica  Meyrick, 1911  (India)
 Opogona elaitis  Meyrick, 1911  (India)
 Opogona fascigera Meyrick, 1915
 Opogona fatima Meyrick, 1921 (Australia)
 Opogona flavofasciata (Stainton, 1859) (India to Philippines)
 Opogona floridensis Davis, 1978 (Florida)
 Opogona fumiceps  (India, Sri Lanka)
 Opogona glycyphaga Meyrick, 1915 (Australia)
 Opogona hylarcha  Meyrick, 1928  (India)
 Opogona icterica Meyrick, 1915   (Philippines)
 Opogona iolychna (Meyrick, 1920) (India)
 Opogona isoclina  Meyrick, 1907  (India)
 Opogona isotalanta Meyrick, 1930
 Opogona lamprocrossa  Meyrick, 1928  (Andaman)
 Opogona lamprophanes  Meyrick, 1915  (Sri Lanka) 
 Opogona liparopis  Meyrick, 1922  (India)
 Opogona loculata  Meyrick, 1915  (India)
 Opogona lutigena  Meyrick, 1915  (India)
 Opogona micranthes (Meyrick, 1897) (Australia)
 Opogona molybdis  Meyrick, 1915  (India)
 Opogona monosticta  (Meyrick, 1915)  (India)
 Opogona nebularis (Meyrick, 1897) (Australia)
 Opogona nipponica Stringer, 1930
 Opogona omoscopa Meyrick, 1893
 Opogona orchestris  Meyrick, 1911  (Sri Lanka)
 Opogona orthotis (Meyrick, 1897)
 Opogona pandora  Meyrick, 1911  (India)
 Opogona praecincta  Meyrick, 1916  (India)
 Opogona promalacta  Meyrick, 1915 (Australia)
 Opogona protographa  Meyrick, 1911  (India)
 Opogona protomima  (Meyrick, 1918)  (India)
 Opogona papayae Turner, 1923 (Australia)
 Opogona percnodes  Meyrick, 1910 (India)
 Opogona psola  Bradley, 1956 (Norfolk island)
 Opogona praestans (Walsingham, 1892) (St.Vincent)
 Opogona promalacta Meyrick, 1915 (Australia)
 Opogona protodoxa (Meyrick, 1897) (Australia)
 Opogona regressa Meyrick, 1916
 Opogona sacchari (Bojer, 1856) (Seychelles, Cape Verde, Réunion, Mauritius, Madagascar, St.Helena; introduced:Brazil, Central America, Europe, Florida, Bermuda, Japan, Portugal (Madeira); Spain (Canary Islands))
 Opogona sarophila Meyrick, 1915 (Australia)
 Opogona scabricoma  Meyrick, 1934  (India)
 Opogona scalena (Meyrick, 1897) (Australia)
 Opogona simoniella (Wallengren, 1861) (Cocos Keeling)
 Opogona stathmota  Meyrick, 1911  (Sri Lanka)
 Opogona stenocraspeda (Meyrick, 1897)  (Australia)
 Opogona stereodyta (Meyrick, 1897) (Australia)
 Opogona succulenta  Meyrick, 1931  (Andaman)
 Opogona taochroa Meyrick, 1934
 Opogona tanydora  Meyrick, 1920 (Kenya)
 Opogona tetrasema (Turner, 1917) (Australia)
 Opogona tergemina  Meyrick, 1915  (India)
 Opogona thiadelpha Meyrick, 1934
 Opogona trachyclina  Meyrick, 1935
 Opogona transversata  Bippus, 2016 (Reunion)
 Opogona trichoceros Meyrick, 1930
 Opogona trigonomis  Meyrick, 1907  (Sri Lanka)
 Opogona trissostacta Meyrick, 1934
 Opogona tristicta (Meyrick, 1897) (Australia)
 Opogona trophis Meyrick, 1913 (South Africa)
 Opogona ursella (Walker, 1875) (St.Helena)
 Opogona vilis 	(Wollaston E., 1879) (St.Helena)
 Opogona xanthocrita Meyrick, 1911
 Opogona zygodonta  Meyrick, 1931  (India)

Some species have been removed from the present genus. For example, O. panchalcella is now in Wegneria.

Synonyms
Groups of these moths have been proposed for separation in distinct genera. Here however, the genus is considered to contain the core group of Hieroxestinae and is thus delimited sensu lato. Junior synonyms and other invalid scientific names of Opogona are:

 Cachura Walker, 1864
 Conchyliospila Wallengren, 1861
 Conchyliopsila (lapsus)
 Dendroneura Walsingham, 1892
 Exala Meyrick, 1912
 Hieroxestis Meyrick, 1893
 Lozostoma Stainton, 1859
 Loxostoma (lapsus nec Bivona-Bernardi 1838: preoccupied)
 Lissocarena Turner, 1923

Footnotes

References
  (2010): Australian Faunal Directory – Opogona. Version of 2010-NOV-15. Retrieved 2011-DEC-23.
  (2011): Opogona. Version 2.4, 2011-JAN-27. Retrieved 2011-DEC-23.
  (1986): Pyralidae and Microlepidoptera of the Marquesas Archipelago. Smithsonian Contributions to Zoology 416: 1-485. PDF fulltext (214 MB!)
  (2004): Butterflies and Moths of the World, Generic Names and their Type-species – Opogona. Version of 2004-NOV-05. Retrieved 2011-DEC-23.
  [2011]: Global Taxonomic Database of Tineidae (Lepidoptera). Retrieved 2011-DEC-23.
  (2003): Markku Savela's Lepidoptera and some other life forms – Opogona. Version of 2003-DEC-28. Retrieved 2011-DEC-23.

 
Hieroxestinae
Taxa named by Philipp Christoph Zeller